The Congregation of Our Lady of Sion (abbreviated by its members as N.D.S.) is composed of two Roman Catholic religious congregations founded in Paris, France. One is composed of Catholic priests and Religious Brothers, founded in 1852, and the other is composed of Religious Sisters, founded in 1843, both by Marie Theodor Ratisbonne, along with his brother Marie-Alphonse Ratisbonne, "to witness in the Church and in the world that God continues to be faithful in his love for the Jewish people and to hasten the fulfillment of the promises concerning the Jews and the Gentiles." (Constitution, article 2).

Foundation

The Brothers

The Ratisbonne brothers, who were Jews, were drawn to accept Christianity. For Theodore, this came about through the conversion of several close friends and the slow results of study and reading. He was baptized in 1826 and ordained in 1830.

Alphonse, however, was more reluctant to believe in Christ. This changed dramatically on 20 January 1842 in the course of a trip to Rome, made just prior to his planned wedding. While on a visit to the Church of Sant'Andrea delle Fratte, the Blessed Virgin Mary appeared to him. Both brothers believed that this was a sign from God, not only for Alphonse's personal conversion, but of their common call to bring their fellow Jews to accept the Christian faith.

To this end, Alphonse was baptized and soon entered the Society of Jesus, where he spent several years. In 1843 Theodore founded a small community of women who wished to collaborate with him in the education of Jewish children, starting with two Jewish sisters who had come to him for guidance and later converted to Christianity. In 1850, with the permission of the pope and of the Jesuit Superior General, Alphonse left the Society to join his brother and his work. Together the Ratisbonne brothers established the Congregation of the Fathers of Our Lady of Sion in 1852.

In 1855 Alphonse moved to the Holy Land, where, in 1858, he established the Convent of the Ecce homo on the site of a ruined church of that name on the famed Via Dolorosa for the  Sisters of the congregation. On the grounds of the convent, Ratisbonne built an orphanage and vocational school which the Sisters ran. These institutions were open to all the children of the city, regardless of creed. A motherhouse was established in Paris for the Fathers. In 1874, Alphonse began the construction of the Ratisbonne Monastery, on a site then on the outskirts of Jerusalem, which was a school for boys. It now houses a branch of the Salesian Pontifical University.

After the re-direction of the official teachings regarding Judaism, the Fathers changed from an emphasis on the conversion of Jews to working to foster understanding and the development of deeper ties between Christians and Jews. Today they have communities in France, Israel and Brazil.

The Sisters
For many years most of the Sisters were teachers in Sion schools in France and the Holy Land. They later expanded overseas to the British Isles and Australia. 
The sisters of Sion define themselves as “woman who help to heal a fractured world”.
The Sisters were invited to England by Cardinal Manning to help with the expansion of Catholic education in the country. They arrived in 1860 and have had a presence in England ever since. They then established a presence in Australia with the first Sisters arriving in 1890.

Since the Second Vatican Council the work of the Sisters has expanded and developed. Now there is a wide variety of ministries. The congregation now has Sisters in 22 countries worldwide, with their General Motherhouse located in Rome.

Like the Fathers, the Sisters no longer emphasise conversion, but instead describe themselves as working to improve Catholic-Jewish relations and to witness to God's faithful love for the Jewish people.

One of its best-known members of the Congregation was Sœur Emmanuelle, N.D.S., (1908-2008) who worked in Istanbul and Cairo.

Schools
Our Lady of Sion College, Melbourne, Australia
Catholic College, Sale, Victoria, Australia
Ecole bilingue Notre-Dame de Sion, Montreal, Canada
Our Lady of Sion School, Worthing, England
Lycée Notre Dame de Sion Istanbul, Istanbul, Turkey
Notre Dame de Sion School, Kansas City, Missouri, USA
Colegio Nuestra Señora de Sion, Moravia, Costa Rica
Colegio Notre Dame de Sion, Rio de Janeiro, Brasil
Colégio Nossa Senhora de Sion, Curitiba, Brasil
Notre Dame de Sion School, Alexandria, Egypt
St. Maurice School, Winnipeg, Canada

See also
Convent of the Sisters of Zion
Ratisbonne Monastery, Jerusalem
Geza Vermes, a member of the Brothers from the late 1940s until about 1957.

References

External links
Notre Dame de Sion website (multilingual)
Notre Dame de Sion in Ein Kerem (the convent of Saint John in Montana), Israel (multilingual)
Sisters of Sion - United Kingdom/Ireland Province 
A private bilingual school located in Montreal, Canada founded by Sisters of Sion
Notre Dame de Sion Fransiz Lisesi, Istanbul, Turkey
 Archives of Sisters Of Our Lady Of Sion - Monastery Brussels in ODIS - Online Database for Intermediary Structures

Religious organizations established in 1843
Catholic teaching orders
Catholic religious institutes established in the 19th century
Catholic female orders and societies
Catholic Church in Jerusalem
Catholicism and Judaism
1843 establishments in France